The 1984 Ginny of San Diego was a women's tennis tournament played on outdoor hard courts at the Morley Field Sports Complex in San Diego, California in the United States that was part of the Ginny Circuit of the 1984 Virginia Slims World Championship Series. The tournament was held from September 17 through September 23, 1984.

Finals

Singles
 Debbie Spence defeated  Betsy Nagelsen 6–3, 6–7, 6–4
 It was Spence's only career title.

Doubles
 Betsy Nagelsen /  Paula Smith defeated  Terry Holladay /  Iwona Kuczyńska 6–2, 6–4
 It was Nagelsen's 2nd title of the year and the 13th of her career. It was Smith's 3rd title of the year and the 9th of her career.

References

External links
 Tournament draws
 Tournament fact sheet

Ginny of San Diego
Southern California Open
Virg
Virg